Song Yoo-Geol (Korea:송유걸, born February 16, 1985) is a South Korean football player who currently plays as a goalkeeper for Gangneung Citizen FC.

His first club is Chunnam Dragons, Song played only one game at Hauzen Cup in 2006 and moved to league rivals Incheon United in July 2007.

On 28 November 2011, he joined Gangwon FC in a swap deal involving goalkeeper Yoo Hyun.

Song also participated in South Korea U-23 as of Olympic football team.

Club career statistics

References

External links
 

1985 births
Living people
Association football goalkeepers
South Korean footballers
Jeonnam Dragons players
Incheon United FC players
Gangwon FC players
Ansan Mugunghwa FC players
Ulsan Hyundai FC players
Busan IPark players
Gangneung City FC players
K League 2 players
K League 1 players
K3 League players
Footballers at the 2008 Summer Olympics
Olympic footballers of South Korea
Sportspeople from Busan